Popowia fusca is a species of plant in the family Annonaceae. It is a tree found in Peninsular Malaysia and Singapore.

References

fusca
Trees of Malaya
Least concern plants
Taxonomy articles created by Polbot